Zhang Lin (born 11 November 1993) is a male Chinese racewalker. He competed in the 50 kilometres walk event at the 2015 World Championships in Athletics in Beijing, China, finishing the 6th. 

In 2020 he was sanctioned for doping violations until December 2027.

See also
 China at the 2015 World Championships in Athletics

References

Chinese male racewalkers
Living people
Doping cases in athletics
Place of birth missing (living people)
1993 births
World Athletics Championships athletes for China
Athletes (track and field) at the 2014 Asian Games
Asian Games competitors for China